Mouda, (or Mauda) is a town and a Tehsil in the Ramtek subdivision of the Nagpur district in the Nagpur Revenue Division. It is situated in the Berar region in the state of Maharashtra, India. The total area covered under this Tehsil is around 61,293.17 hectares. The population of this tehsil is around 37,554 (19,566 male, 17,978 female)according to the 1991 census. The nearest city to Mouda is Nagpur, which is 38 km away.  The total number of villages in this tehsil is 41. Mouda is famous for its fertile agricultural land. Therefore, the main occupation is farming. Average rainfall here is estimated to be around 1223.3mm. It is located on the banks of Kanhan River and near National Highway 6.

Villages

References 

Cities and towns in Nagpur district
Nagpur district
Talukas in Maharashtra